This is the list of awards and nominations received by the American television series Alias (2001–2006).

By Awards

ALMA Awards
2006: Outstanding Television Series (nominated) 
2006: Outstanding Director of a Television Drama or Comedy (Jay Torres for "Out of the Box", nominated)

American Choreography Awards (ACA)
2001: Outstanding Fight Choreography (for "Truth Be Told (Pilot)", won)

American Cinema Editors (ACE)
2001: Best Edited One-Hour Series for Television (for "Truth Be Told (Pilot)", nominated)

American Society of Cinematographers (ASC)
2001: Outstanding Achievement in Cinematography in Episodic TV Series (for "Time Will Tell", nominated)
2002: Outstanding Achievement in Cinematography in Episodic TV Series (for "Page 47", nominated)

Art Directors Guild (ADG)
2001: Excellence in Production Design - Episode of a Single-Camera Series (for "Reckoning", nominated)
2002: Excellence in Production Design - Episode of a Single Camera TV Series (for "Cipher", won)
2003: Excellence in Production Design - Single Camera TV Series (nominated)
2004: Excellence in Production Design - Single Camera TV Series (for "Legacy", nominated)

Casting Society of America (CSA)
2001: Best Casting for Television - Dramatic Episodic (nominated)
2001: Best Casting for Television - Dramatic Pilot (nominated)
2002: Best Casting for Television - Dramatic Episodic (nominated)
2003: Best Casting for Television - Dramatic Episodic (nominated)

Emmy Awards
2002: Outstanding Actress - Drama Series (Jennifer Garner for playing "Sydney Bristow", nominated) 
2002: Outstanding Art Direction - Single-Camera Series (for "Truth Be Told (Pilot)", won) 
2002: Outstanding Casting - Drama Series (nominated) 
2002: Outstanding Cinematography - Single-Camera Series (for "Truth Be Told (Pilot)", won)
2002: Outstanding Costumes - Series (for "Truth Be Told (Pilot)", nominated)
2002: Outstanding Hairstyling - Series (for "Q & A", nominated)
2002: Outstanding Makeup, Non-Prosthetic - Series (for "Q & A", nominated)
2002: Outstanding Picture Editing, Single-Camera - Series (for "Q & A", nominated)
2002: Outstanding Stunt Coordination (for "Time Will Tell", nominated)
2002: Outstanding Supporting Actor - Drama Series (Victor Garber for playing "Jack Bristow", nominated)
2002: Outstanding Writing - Drama Series (J. J. Abrams for "Truth Be Told (Pilot)", nominated)
2003: Outstanding Actress - Drama Series (Garner, nominated)
2003: Outstanding Art Direction - Single-Camera Series (for "Phase One", nominated)
2003: Outstanding Cinematography - Single-Camera Series (for "Double Agent", nominated)
2003: Outstanding Costumes - Series (for "Phase One", nominated)
2003: Outstanding Hairstyling - Series (for "The Counteragent", nominated)
2003: Outstanding Makeup, Non-Prosthetic - Series (for "The Counteragent", won)
2003: Outstanding Picture Editing, Single-Camera - Drama Series (for "Phase One", nominated)
2003: Outstanding Sound Editing - Series (for "Phase One", nominated)
2003: Outstanding Stunt Coordination (for "The Telling", won)
2003: Outstanding Supporting Actor - Drama Series (Garber, nominated)
2003: Outstanding Supporting Actress - Drama Series (Lena Olin for playing "Irina Derevko", nominated)
2004: Outstanding Actress - Drama Series (Garner, nominated)
2004: Outstanding Art Direction - Single-Camera Series (for "Taken", nominated)
2004: Outstanding Cinematography - Single-Camera Series (for "Conscious", nominated)
2004: Outstanding Hairstyling - Series (for "Unveiled", nominated)
2004: Outstanding Sound Editing - Series (for "Resurrection", nominated)
2004: Outstanding Sound Mixing, Single-Camera - Series (for "Hourglass", nominated)
2004: Outstanding Stunt Coordination (for "Resurrection", nominated)
2004: Outstanding Supporting Actor - Drama Series (Garber, nominated)
2005: Outstanding Actress - Drama Series (Garner, nominated)
2005: Outstanding Costumes - Series (for "Tuesday", nominated)
2005: Outstanding Hairstyling - Series (for "Nocturne", nominated)
2005: Outstanding Stunt Coordination (for "The Awful Truth", nominated)
2006: Outstanding Hairstyling - Series (for "There's Only One Sydney Bristow", nominated)
2006: Outstanding Stunt Coordination (for "Reprisal" and "All the Time in the World", nominated)

Golden Globe Awards
2002: Best Actress - Drama Series (Jennifer Garner for playing "Sydney Bristow", won) 
2002: Best Television Series - Drama (nominated)
2003: Best Actress - Drama Series (Garner, nominated)
2004: Best Actress - Drama Series (Garner, nominated)
2005: Best Actress - Drama Series (Garner, nominated)

People's Choice Awards
2002: Favorite Television New Drama Series (won)
2005: Favorite Television Drama (nominated)

Producers Guild of America (PGA)
2003: Television Producer of the Year - Episodic Drama (nominated)

Satellite Awards
2002: Best Actress - Drama Series (Jennifer Garner for playing "Sydney Bristow", nominated)
2002: Best Series - Drama (nominated)
2002: Best Supporting Actor - Drama Series (Victor Garber for playing "Jack Bristow", won)
2002: Best Supporting Actor - Drama Series (Ron Rifkin for playing "Arvin Sloane", nominated)
2002: Best Supporting Actress - Drama Series (Lena Olin for playing "Irina Derevko", nominated)
2003: Best Actress - Drama Series (Garner, nominated)
2003: Best DVD Release - TV Series (for "Season 2", won)
2003: Best Supporting Actress - Drama Series (Olin, nominated)
2004: Best Actress - Drama Series (Garner, nominated)
2004: Best DVD Release - TV Series (for "Season 3", nominated)
2006: Best DVD Release - TV Series (for "Season 5", nominated)

Screen Actors Guild (SAG)
2003: Outstanding Actress - Drama Series (Jennifer Garner for playing "Sydney Bristow", nominated) 
2004: Outstanding Actress - Drama Series (Garner, won)

Teen Choice Awards
2004: Choice TV Show - Drama/Action Adventure (nominated)
2004: Choice TV Actress - Drama/Action Adventure (Garner, won)

Visual Effects Society (VES)
2005: Outstanding Supporting Visual Effects - Broadcast Program (for "The Index", nominated)
2006: Outstanding Supporting Visual Effects - Broadcast Program (for "All the Time in the World" and "Reprisal", nominated)

References

External links
 Awards won by Alias at IMDb

Alias
Awards and nominations